Ormskirk is a market town in the West Lancashire district of Lancashire, England,  north of Liverpool,  northwest of St Helens,  southeast of Southport and  southwest of Preston.  Ormskirk is known for its gingerbread.

Geography and administration
Ormskirk is an unparished area, surrounded by the parishes of Bickerstaffe, Aughton, Scarisbrick, Burscough, Lathom and Lathom South.

The town is located in the district of West Lancashire and is the site of the headquarters of West Lancashire Borough Council.

Since Ormskirk does not have a parish council, a voluntary association, Ormskirk Community Partnership, was created in 2009, with the support of the West Lancashire Borough Council, to act as a voice for Ormskirk. Ormskirk is home to Edge Hill University.

History
The name is Old Norse in origin and is derived from Ormres kirkja, from a personal name, Ormr (which means "serpent" or dragon), and the Old Norse word kirkja for church. Ormr may have been a Viking who settled here, became a Christian and founded the church but there are no other records or archaeological evidence to support this and Ormr's identity is unknown.  

There is no reference to Ormskirk in the Domesday Book of 1086, but it has been suggested that it may have been part of Lathom at that time.  In about 1189, the lord of Lathom granted the church of Ormskirk to Burscough Priory, which does suggest that Ormskirk had been subordinate to Lathom before that date.

An open market is held twice weekly, on Thursdays and Saturdays, in the pedestrianised centre of Ormskirk. The location was originally the junction of the main roads to Preston, Liverpool and Wigan, and was marked by a market cross going back to medieval times. During the 18th and 19th centuries the Cross, as the junction was known, was the location of a large lamp mounted on an obelisk with a circular drinking fountain for both people and animals around the base. This was moved to the junction of St Helens Road and Moor Street to make room for the erection of the clock tower in 1876.

The fountain was then moved again to opposite the Drill Hall down Southport Road in the 1890s when space was needed to site the Disraeli statue. The market was established by a royal charter that was granted by Edward I in 1286 to the monks of Burscough Priory. Thursday has been market day in Ormskirk since at least 1292. The King also granted a borough charter to Ormskirk at about the same time, but this seems to have become extinct by the end of the 15th century.

The Ormskirk Poor Law Union was established in 1837, covering 21 parishes and townships from Tarleton to Simonswood, and from Birkdale to Skelmersdale. Ormskirk Union Workhouse was built in 1853 on Wigan Road and later became Ormskirk District General Hospital.

With its weekly markets, the town became a focal point for local farmers and their agricultural workers, cottagers, cow-keepers etc. to trade their goods and obtain necessities from the markets and from the retail establishments which were established along with public houses and inns. An engineering industry, based on making and mending agricultural machinery also developed.

The town became known for its gingerbread over the years when local women would bake the gingerbread in their own homes and then take it to the staging inns to sell to passengers. When the railway arrived in the mid 19th century, the local gingerbread sellers found a new market. They were allowed to sell their product to passengers travelling through the railway station. One particular customer Edward, Prince of Wales, later Edward VII, enjoyed the local gingerbread so much he sent orders to the town. The baking of gingerbread became part of the retail history of the town, with several local bakers claiming to have the original gingerbread recipe. A well known local woman, Sally Woods, was a recognisable figure on the market selling her gingerbread.

Parish Church of St Peter and St Paul

The Parish Church of St Peter and St Paul is believed to be on the site of the original kirk, on a sandstone outcrop, and is the oldest building in the town. Its exact age is unknown; the building does contain some fragments of Norman architecture.

The parish church has many connections with the Earls of Derby and the Stanley family. Many family members are buried in the church's Derby Chapel, including Thomas Stanley, the first Earl, who caused Richard III to lose his crown by changing sides at the Battle of Bosworth in 1485, and the Royalist James Stanley, the seventh Earl, who was beheaded at Bolton in 1651 after the Civil War. His body is buried in one coffin and his head in a separate casket.

This is one of only three parish churches in England to have a tower and a separate spire, and is unique in that it has both at the same end of the building. (The other two are St Mary's Church, Purton and St Andrew's Church, Wanborough, both near Swindon, in Wiltshire). Legend has it that Orme had two sisters, one who wanted a tower, and one who wanted a spire, and Orme built both to please both.

The 'steeple' in fact dates from the early 15th century, but the original blew down in 1731 and was rebuilt between 1790 and 1832. The large west tower was added to the church around 1548 to house the bells of nearby Burscough Priory following the Dissolution of the Monasteries. One of these bells can still be seen in the church.

Transport

The A59 is the main road, with Preston to the north and Liverpool to the south. The A570, from Southport, crosses the town from west to east and provides a link to the national motorway network at junction 3 of the M58, about three miles from the town centre. It then continues to St Helens before reaching the M62 at Junction 7, Rainhill Stoops. The town has its own bus station, Ormskirk bus station.

The town's railway station, which was refurbished at a cost of £1 million in 2009, is a northern terminus of Merseyrail, and the line continues, with a change from electric to diesel multiple units, through to Preston, after the direct service was partitioned in 1970. This line was promoted by the Liverpool, Ormskirk and Preston Railway in August 1846, but was completed by the East Lancashire Railway. The route and Ormskirk station opened on 2 April 1849, the undertaking being merged into the Lancashire and Yorkshire Railway on 13 May 1859.

The Lancashire and Yorkshire Railway built the Skelmersdale Branch line to Skelmersdale and Rainford Junction, which opened on 1 March 1858. Passenger services ended on 5 November 1956, goods to Rainford Junction finished on 16 November 1961 and to Skelmersdale on 4 November 1963.

Local economy
There is a Morrisons on Park Road, which was converted from a Safeway in 2005. The building was formerly home to the local gasworks, and the local Rover/Morris car dealership (Balmforths). The Two Saints is a modest retail park which opened in 2000 and contains a number of retailers including McDonald's, Argos, Mobility Store, Poundland, Aldi and a gym. In December 2013, when Blockbuster entered administration, its store at Two Saints closed. Ormskirk had an indoor market situated on Moorgate, but as of 2021 it is closed pending redevelopment. A Tesco Metro was located on Church Street, but it closed in April 2015.

An out of town business park, The Hattersley Centre, opened in February 2008, with a Home Bargains, Howdens, Tile Giant, Magnet, Jewson, Halfords (which closed in 2020) and a Plumbase. After Focus DIY went into administration, its store on the Hattersley Centre closed. The unit which it occupied was split into three, two being occupied by Home Bargains and The Food Warehouse by Iceland. An application for Asda to open in the unit was rejected in February 2011, after the application was submitted in August 2009. The centre was never fully occupied, and had been struggling since its completion. Netto closed down in August 2016, after the firm pulled out of the United Kingdom. The store had opened in November 2014.  2019 saw the Hattersley Centre expand with new units being built on adjacent unused land and occupied by Lidl and Toolstation. The expansion followed funding of £6.2M being secured from the Royal Bank of Scotland to clear the adjacent land and build new units. 2019 also saw Magnet vacate one of the units, but this was quickly occupied by Screwfix.

One of the last significant manufacturing businesses remaining in Ormskirk were Atkinson & Kirby, who make hardwood floors and employed 80 people. They relocated in September 2015 after operating from Ormskirk for over 100 years. Businesses in the town are mainly professional and financial services, such as solicitors, estate agents, and accountants.

Education
Ormskirk School (ages 11–18) is on Wigan Road in the east of the town, situated on a site formerly home to the demolished Cross Hall High School. Ormskirk School is the result of a merger between Ormskirk Grammar School and Cross Hall High School. St Bede's Catholic High School (ages 11–16) is on St Anne's Road next to the A59 and Prescot Road, and opposite St Anne's Church. Edge Hill University is on the A570 St Helens Road heading east. West Lancashire College, a further education college, used to have a site in the town centre on Hants Lane but its students now have to travel to Skelmersdale. Ormskirk is also home to a public library.

Parks and open spaces
The town has three main parks and a number of other smaller play areas and open spaces.  The main parks are:-
 Victoria Park, named after Queen Victoria, is Ormskirk's oldest park, established towards the end of the 19th century.  It contains a monument to local heroes of the Boer War and Crimean War. It is located on the triangle of land between Knowsley Road, St Helens Road and Ruff Lane.
 Coronation Park, a large park in the town centre on Park Road, which has children's play areas, skateboard area, games area for football and basketball, fitness equipment, duck pond, bowling green, bandstand and wildlife meadow.  The Park was established in about 1905 by the former Ormskirk Urban District to commemorate the coronation of King Edward VII.  In 2012 the Ormskirk War Memorial was relocated here from its original site in front of the former Comrades' Club on Southport Road.
 Ruff Wood, a countryside park on the edge of the town, on Ruff Lane.

Notable people
See :Category:People from Ormskirk

Other connections

 Robert Harkness (born), Professor of Geology and Mineralogy, FRS FRSE FGS., Queen's College, Cork. 
 Tom Pearce (footballer) (football player for Leeds United, born in Ormskirk and went to Ormskirk School)
 Billy Ayre (lived and died), football player and manager
 Mark Bonner (born), footballer
 Kieran Dowell (born), footballer at Norwich City and England U'20 World Cup Winner
 Wes Fletcher (born), footballer at York City
 Joseph Brandreth (born), physician
 Alexander Critchley (born) M.P. for Liverpool Edge Hill 1935–1945.
 Jon Culshaw (born), impressionist
 Vickey Dixon (born), hockey player and bronze medal winner at the 1992 Summer Olympics
 Richard Drummie, musician
 Duncan Ferguson (lives), footballer
 Marianne Faithfull, singer
 Alexander Goss (1814-1872), was a Roman Catholic Bishop, Bishop of Liverpool
 Helen Hayes (raised), MP for Dulwich and West Norwood (UK Parliament constituency) since 2015 
Gavin Griffiths (born) Leicestershire County cricket player 
 William Edward Heaton (born), recipient of the Victoria Cross
 James Hopwood Jeans (born), physicist, astronomer and mathematician
 Stuart Maconie (student), TV presenter
 Stephen James Bennett (born), Academic, musician and writer
 Edward Peck (academic administrator),(school) Vice Chancellor of Nottingham Trent University
 Tom Middlehurst, former Welsh AM and Education Minister. 
 William Moorcroft, veterinary surgeon, horse breeding expert, explorer
 Nicholas Monsarrat (lived), novelist, author of The Cruel Sea
 Tony Morley (born), England and Aston Villa footballer, European Cup winner in 1982
 Jimmy O'Neill (lived), Irish international footballer
 Les Pattinson (born), former member of Echo & the Bunnymen
 Jonathan Pryce (student), actor
 Jack Renshaw, far-right activist and convicted terrorist
 John Rimmer (born), athlete and winner of two gold medals at the 1900 Summer Olympics
 Robbie Slater (born), Australian footballer
 John Souch (born), seventeenth-century painter
 Stephen Warnock (born), England and Liverpool footballer
 Nicole Webster (born), Australian marine scientist
 Helen Whitaker Girl Guide leader and Commissioner for British Guides Abroad
 The Ormesher Sisters, Victims of an unsolved double murder in 1956

Gallery

See also

 Listed buildings in Ormskirk
 Edge Hill University
 Ormskirk Urban District
 Ormskirk (UK Parliament constituency)
 West Lancashire (UK Parliament constituency)

Notes

References
 Duggan, Mona (1998) Ormskirk, the Making of a Modern Town. Stroud: Sutton

External links

 
Towns in Lancashire
Market towns in Lancashire
Unparished areas in Lancashire
Geography of the Borough of West Lancashire